Diego Martins da Costa e Silva (born 3 October 1989 in Barcelos), known as simply Diego, is a Portuguese footballer who plays as a goalkeeper.

Club career
Diego started his football career at Sporting de Braga. In June 2008 he signed a 1+2 professional contract with the Minho club, but spent his first years as a senior or loan, to various clubs in the Portuguese second and third divisions.

International career
Diego was capped once for the Portuguese U21s, in a friendly match. He also played for the U19 side in the 2008 UEFA European Football Championship elite qualification.

References

External links

Portuguese League profile 

1989 births
Living people
People from Barcelos, Portugal
Portuguese footballers
Association football goalkeepers
Liga Portugal 2 players
Segunda Divisão players
S.C. Braga players
G.D. Ribeirão players
S.C. Covilhã players
Associação Naval 1º de Maio players
Vilaverdense F.C. players
F.C. Famalicão players
S.C. Salgueiros players
C.D. Cinfães players
F.C. Felgueiras 1932 players
S.C. Espinho players
Portugal under-21 international footballers
Sportspeople from Braga District